This is a list of the species of birds found in Egypt, a country in north-east Africa. The avifauna of Egypt include a total of 497 species of birds. No species are endemic to Egypt.

This list's taxonomic treatment (designation and sequence of orders, families and species) and nomenclature (common and scientific names) follow the conventions of The Clements Checklist of Birds of the World, 2022 edition. All of the birds below are included in the total bird count for Egypt.

The following tags have been used to highlight several categories. The commonly occurring native species do not fall into any of these categories.

 (A) Accidental - a species that rarely or accidentally occurs in Egypt
 (I) Introduced - a species introduced to Egypt as a consequence, direct or indirect, of human actions
 (Ex) Extirpated - a species that no longer occurs in Egypt although populations exist elsewhere
 (X) Extinct - a species or subspecies that no longer exists.

Ostriches
Order: StruthioniformesFamily: Struthionidae

The ostrich is a flightless bird native to Africa. It is the largest living species of bird. It is distinctive in its appearance, with a long neck and legs and the ability to run at high speeds.

Common ostrich, Struthio camelus
North African ostrich, Struthio camelus camelus
Arabian ostrich,  Struthio camelus syriacus (X)

Ducks, geese, and waterfowl
Order: AnseriformesFamily: Anatidae

Anatidae includes the ducks and most duck-like waterfowl, such as geese and swans. These birds are adapted to an aquatic existence with webbed feet, flattened bills, and feathers that are excellent at shedding water due to an oily coating.

Graylag goose, Anser anser
Greater white-fronted goose, Anser albifrons
Lesser white-fronted goose, Anser erythropus (A)
Taiga bean-goose, Anser fabalis (A)
Brant, Branta bernicla (A)
Barnacle goose, Branta leucopsis (A)
Red-breasted goose, Branta ruficollis (A)
Mute swan, Cygnus olor
Whooper swan, Cygnus cygnus (A)
Egyptian goose, Alopochen aegyptiacus
Ruddy shelduck, Tadorna ferruginea
Common shelduck, Tadorna tadorna
Spur-winged goose, Plectropterus gambensis (I)
Garganey, Spatula querquedula
Blue-winged teal, Spatula discors (A)
Northern shoveler, Spatula clypeata
Gadwall, Mareca strepera
Eurasian wigeon, Mareca penelope
Mallard, Anas platyrhynchos
Northern pintail, Anas acuta
Green-winged teal, Anas crecca
Marbled teal, Marmaronetta angustirostris
Red-crested pochard, Netta rufina
Common pochard, Aythya ferina
Ferruginous duck, Aythya nyroca
Tufted duck, Aythya fuligula
Velvet scoter, Melanitta fusca (A)
Smew, Mergellus albellus
Red-breasted merganser, Mergus serrator
Ruddy duck, Oxyura jamaicensis (I)
White-headed duck, Oxyura leucocephala

Pheasants, grouse, and allies
Order: GalliformesFamily: Phasianidae

The Phasianidae are a family of terrestrial birds. In general, they are plump (although they vary in size) and have broad, relatively short wings.

Sand partridge, Ammoperdix heyi
Common quail, Coturnix coturnix; Ancient Egyptian: pcr.t > Coptic: PERE (meaning unknown)
Barbary partridge, Alectoris barbara "aegypticus" (Siwa, Marsa Matruah)
Chukar, Alectoris chukar

Flamingos
Order: PhoenicopteriformesFamily: Phoenicopteridae

Flamingos filter-feed on shellfish and algae. Their oddly shaped beaks are specially adapted to separate mud and silt from the food they consume and, uniquely, are used upside-down.

Greater flamingo, Phoenicopterus roseus
Lesser flamingo, Phoenicopterus minor (A)

Grebes
Order: PodicipediformesFamily: Podicipedidae

Grebes are small to medium-large freshwater diving birds. They have lobed toes and are excellent swimmers and divers. However, they have their feet placed far back on the body, making them quite ungainly on land.

Little grebe, Tachybaptus ruficollis
Red-necked grebe, Podiceps grisegena (A)
Great crested grebe, Podiceps cristatus
Eared grebe, Podiceps nigricollis

Pigeons and doves
Order: ColumbiformesFamily: Columbidae

Pigeons and doves are stout-bodied birds with short necks and short slender bills with a fleshy cere.

Rock pigeon, Columba livia; Ancient Egyptian  'one of turquoise colour' (?)
Stock dove, Columba oenas
Common wood-pigeon, Columba palumbus (A)
European turtle-dove, Streptopelia turtur turtur; Ancient Egyptian: mnw.t (meaning unknown)
Oriental turtle-dove, Streptopelia orientalis (A)
Eurasian collared-dove, Streptopelia decaocto
African collared-dove, Streptopelia roseogrisea
Mourning collared-dove, Streptopelia decipiens (A)
Laughing dove, Streptopelia senegalensis; Ancient Egyptian: cb3 'glittering, shining one'
Namaqua dove, Oena capensis
Bruce's green-pigeon, Treron waalia (A)

Sandgrouse

Order: PterocliformesFamily: Pteroclidae

Sandgrouse have small, pigeon like heads and necks, but sturdy compact bodies. They have long pointed wings and sometimes tails and a fast direct flight. Flocks fly to watering holes at dawn and dusk. Their legs are feathered down to the toes.

Pin-tailed sandgrouse, Pterocles alchata (A)
Chestnut-bellied sandgrouse, Pterocles exustus (A)
Spotted sandgrouse, Pterocles senegallus
Black-bellied sandgrouse, Pterocles orientalis
Crowned sandgrouse, Pterocles coronatus
Lichtenstein's sandgrouse, Pterocles lichtensteinii

Bustards

Order: OtidiformesFamily: Otididae

Bustards are large terrestrial birds mainly associated with dry open country and steppes in the Old World. They are omnivorous and nest on the ground. They walk steadily on strong legs and big toes, pecking for food as they go. They have long broad wings with "fingered" wingtips and striking patterns in flight. Many have interesting mating displays.

Great bustard, Otis tarda (A)
Houbara bustard, Chlamydotis undulata
Macqueen's bustard, Chlamydotis macqueenii
Little bustard, Tetrax tetrax (Ex)

Cuckoos
Order: CuculiformesFamily: Cuculidae

The family Cuculidae includes cuckoos, roadrunners and anis. These birds are of variable size with slender bodies, long tails and strong legs.

Senegal coucal, Centropus senegalensis
Great spotted cuckoo, Clamator glandarius
African cuckoo, Cuculus gularis
Common cuckoo, Cuculus canorus

Nightjars and allies
Order: CaprimulgiformesFamily: Caprimulgidae

Nightjars are medium-sized nocturnal birds that usually nest on the ground. They have long wings, short legs and very short bills. Most have small feet, of little use for walking, and long pointed wings. Their soft plumage is camouflaged to resemble bark or leaves.

Eurasian nightjar, Caprimulgus europaeus
Egyptian nightjar, Caprimulgus aegyptius
Nubian nightjar, Caprimulgus nubicus (A)

Swifts
Order: CaprimulgiformesFamily: Apodidae

Swifts are small birds which spend the majority of their lives flying. These birds have very short legs and never settle voluntarily on the ground, perching instead only on vertical surfaces. Many swifts have long swept-back wings which resemble a crescent or boomerang.

Alpine swift, Apus melba
Common swift, Apus apus
Pallid swift, Apus pallidus
Little swift, Apus affinis

Rails, gallinules, and coots
Order: GruiformesFamily: Rallidae

Rallidae is a large family of small to medium-sized birds which includes the rails, crakes, coots and gallinules. Typically they inhabit dense vegetation in damp environments near lakes, swamps or rivers. In general they are shy and secretive birds, making them difficult to observe. Most species have strong legs and long toes which are well adapted to soft uneven surfaces. They tend to have short, rounded wings and to be weak fliers.

Water rail, Rallus aquaticus
Corn crake, Crex crex
Spotted crake, Porzana porzana
Eurasian moorhen, Gallinula chloropus; Ancient Egyptian: sbḥ 'one who cries out, laments'
Lesser moorhen, Gallinula angulata
Eurasian coot, Fulica atra
Allen's gallinule, Porphyrio alleni (A)
African swamphen, Porphyrio madagascariensis
Little crake, Zapornia parva
Baillon's crake, Zapornia pusilla

Cranes

Order: GruiformesFamily: Gruidae

Cranes are large, long-legged and long-necked birds. Unlike the similar-looking but unrelated herons, cranes fly with necks outstretched, not pulled back. Most have elaborate and noisy courting displays or "dances".

Demoiselle crane, Anthropoides virgo; Ancient Egyptian wDc 'splitter' (??)
Common crane, Grus grus; Ancient Egyptian: D3.t 'the one stretching/reaching' or 'borer'

Thick-knees

Order: CharadriiformesFamily: Burhinidae

The thick-knees are a group of largely tropical waders in the family Burhinidae. They are found worldwide within the tropical zone, with some species also breeding in temperate Europe and Australia. They are medium to large waders with strong black or yellow-black bills, large yellow eyes and cryptic plumage. Despite being classed as waders, most species have a preference for arid or semi-arid habitats.

Eurasian thick-knee, Burhinus oedicnemus
Senegal thick-knee, Burhinus senegalensis

Egyptian plover
Order: CharadriiformesFamily: Pluvianidae

The Egyptian plover is found across equatorial Africa and along the Nile River.

Egyptian plover, Pluvianus aegyptius (A)

Stilts and avocets
Order: CharadriiformesFamily: Recurvirostridae

Recurvirostridae is a family of large wading birds, which includes the avocets and stilts. The avocets have long legs and long up-curved bills. The stilts have extremely long legs and long, thin, straight bills.

Black-winged stilt, Himantopus himantopus 
Pied avocet, Recurvirostra avosetta

Oystercatchers

Order: CharadriiformesFamily: Haematopodidae

The oystercatchers are large and noisy plover-like birds, with strong bills used for smashing or prising open molluscs.

Eurasian oystercatcher, Haematopus ostralegus

Plovers and lapwings
Order: CharadriiformesFamily: Charadriidae

The family Charadriidae includes the plovers, dotterels and lapwings. They are small to medium-sized birds with compact bodies, short, thick necks and long, usually pointed, wings. They are found in open country worldwide, mostly in habitats near water.

Black-bellied plover, Pluvialis squatarola
European golden-plover, Pluvialis apricaria
Pacific golden-plover, Pluvialis fulva
Northern lapwing, Vanellus vanellus; Ancient Egyptian: its hieroglyph mostly used to denote rxt 'common folk, subjects'; also once its head follows the word (i)3by.t 'dancer' (cfr. Eng.: lapwing = leap-wing
Spur-winged plover, Vanellus spinosus
Sociable lapwing, Vanellus gregarius
White-tailed lapwing, Vanellus leucurus
Lesser sand-plover, Charadrius mongolus
Greater sand-plover, Charadrius leschenaultii
Caspian plover, Charadrius asiaticus
Kittlitz's plover, Charadrius pecuarius
Kentish plover, Charadrius alexandrinus
Common ringed plover, Charadrius hiaticula
Little ringed plover, Charadrius dubius
Three-banded plover, Charadrius tricollaris 
Eurasian dotterel, Charadrius morinellus

Painted-snipes
Order: CharadriiformesFamily: Rostratulidae

Painted-snipes are short-legged, long-billed birds similar in shape to the true snipes, but more brightly coloured.

Greater painted-snipe, Rostratula benghalensis

Sandpipers and allies
Order: CharadriiformesFamily: Scolopacidae

Scolopacidae is a large diverse family of small to medium-sized shorebirds including the sandpipers, curlews, godwits, shanks, tattlers, woodcocks, snipes, dowitchers and phalaropes. The majority of these species eat small invertebrates picked out of the mud or soil. Variation in length of legs and bills enables multiple species to feed in the same habitat, particularly on the coast, without direct competition for food.

Whimbrel, Numenius phaeopus
Slender-billed curlew, Numenius tenuirostris
Eurasian curlew, Numenius arquata
Bar-tailed godwit, Limosa lapponica
Black-tailed godwit, Limosa limosa
Ruddy turnstone, Arenaria interpres
Red knot, Calidris canutus
Ruff, Calidris pugnax
Broad-billed sandpiper, Calidris falcinellus
Curlew sandpiper, Calidris ferruginea
Temminck's stint, Calidris temminckii
Long-toed stint, Calidris subminuta
Sanderling, Calidris alba
Dunlin, Calidris alpina
Little stint, Calidris minuta 
Pectoral sandpiper, Calidris melanotos (A)
Jack snipe, Lymnocryptes minimus
Eurasian woodcock, Scolopax rusticola
Great snipe, Gallinago media
Common snipe, Gallinago gallinago
Terek sandpiper, Xenus cinereus
Red-necked phalarope, Phalaropus lobatus
Red phalarope, Phalaropus fulicarius
Common sandpiper, Actitis hypoleucos
Green sandpiper, Tringa ochropus
Spotted redshank, Tringa erythropus
Common greenshank, Tringa nebularia
Marsh sandpiper, Tringa stagnatilis
Wood sandpiper, Tringa glareola
Common redshank, Tringa totanus

Crab-plover
Order: CharadriiformesFamily: Dromadidae

The crab-plover is related to the waders. It resembles a plover but with very long grey legs and a strong heavy black bill similar to a tern. It has black-and-white plumage, a long neck, partially webbed feet and a bill designed for eating crabs.

Crab-plover, Dromas ardeola

Pratincoles and coursers
Order: CharadriiformesFamily: Glareolidae

Glareolidae is a family of wading birds comprising the pratincoles, which have short legs, long pointed wings and long forked tails, and the coursers, which have long legs, short wings and long, pointed bills which curve downwards.

Cream-colored courser, Cursorius cursor
Collared pratincole, Glareola pratincola
Oriental pratincole, Glareola maldivarum (A)
Black-winged pratincole, Glareola nordmanni

Skuas and jaegers
Order: CharadriiformesFamily: Stercorariidae

The family Stercorariidae are, in general, medium to large birds, typically with grey or brown plumage, often with white markings on the wings. They nest on the ground in temperate and arctic regions and are long-distance migrants.

Pomarine jaeger, Stercorarius pomarinus
Parasitic jaeger, Stercorarius parasiticus
Long-tailed jaeger, Stercorarius longicaudus

Gulls, terns, and skimmers
Order: CharadriiformesFamily: Laridae

Laridae is a family of medium to large seabirds, the gulls, terns, and skimmers. Gulls are typically grey or white, often with black markings on the head or wings. They have stout, longish bills and webbed feet. Terns are a group of generally medium to large seabirds typically with grey or white plumage, often with black markings on the head. Most terns hunt fish by diving but some pick insects off the surface of fresh water. Terns are generally long-lived birds, with several species known to live in excess of 30 years. Skimmers are a small family of tropical tern-like birds. They have an elongated lower mandible which they use to feed by flying low over the water surface and skimming the water for small fish.

Black-legged kittiwake, Rissa tridactyla
Sabine's gull, Xema sabini (A)
Slender-billed gull, Chroicocephalus genei
Gray-hooded gull, Chroicocephalus cirrocephalus (A)
Black-headed gull, Chroicocephalus ridibundus
Little gull, Hydrocoloeus minutus
Franklin's gull, Leucophaeus pipixcan (A)
Mediterranean gull, Ichthyaetus melanocephalus
White-eyed gull, Ichthyaetus leucophthalmus
Sooty gull, Ichthyaetus hemprichii
Pallas's gull, Ichthyaetus ichthyaetus
Audouin's gull, Ichthyaetus audouinii
Common gull, Larus canus
Yellow-legged gull, Larus michahellis
Caspian gull, Larus cachinnans
Armenian gull, Larus armenicus
Lesser black-backed gull, Larus fuscus
Bridled tern, Onychoprion anaethetus
Little tern, Sternula albifrons
Saunders's tern, Sternula saundersi (A)
Gull-billed tern, Gelochelidon nilotica
Caspian tern, Hydroprogne caspia
Black tern, Chlidonias niger
White-winged tern, Chlidonias leucopterus
Whiskered tern, Chlidonias hybridus
Common tern, Sterna hirundo
White-cheeked tern, Sterna repressa
Great crested tern, Thalasseus bergii
Sandwich tern, Thalasseus sandvicensis
Lesser crested tern, Thalasseus bengalensis
African skimmer, Rynchops flavirostris (A)

Tropicbirds
Order: PhaethontiformesFamily: Phaethontidae

Tropicbirds are slender white birds of tropical oceans, with exceptionally long central tail feathers. Their heads and long wings have black markings.

Red-billed tropicbird, Phaethon aethereus

Albatrosses
Order: ProcellariiformesFamily: Diomedeidae

The albatrosses are among the largest of flying birds, and the great albatrosses from the genus Diomedea have the largest wingspans of any extant birds.

White-capped albatross, Thalassarche cauta (A)

Southern storm-petrels
Order: ProcellariiformesFamily: Oceanitidae

The southern storm-petrels are relatives of the petrels and are the smallest seabirds. They feed on planktonic crustaceans and small fish picked from the surface, typically while hovering. The flight is fluttering and sometimes bat-like.

Wilson's storm-petrel, Oceanites oceanicus

Northern storm-petrels
Order: ProcellariiformesFamily: Hydrobatidae

Though the members of this family are similar in many respects to the southern storm-petrels, including their general appearance and habits, there are enough genetic differences to warrant their placement in a separate family.

Leach's storm-petrel, Hydrobates leucorhous (A)

Shearwaters and petrels
Order: ProcellariiformesFamily: Procellariidae

The procellariids are the main group of medium-sized "true petrels", characterised by united nostrils with medium septum and a long outer functional primary.

Streaked shearwater, Streaked diomedea (A)
Cory's shearwater, Calonectris diomedea
Wedge-tailed shearwater, Ardenna pacifica (A)
Sooty shearwater, Ardenna griseus
Yelkouan shearwater, Puffinus yelkouan
Balearic shearwater, Puffinus mauretanicus (A)
Persian shearwater, Puffinus persicus (A)

Storks
Order: CiconiiformesFamily: Ciconiidae

Storks are large, long-legged, long-necked, wading birds with long, stout bills. Storks are mute, but bill-clattering is an important mode of communication at the nest. Their nests can be large and may be reused for many years. Many species are migratory.

African openbill, Anastomus lamelligerus (A)
Black stork, Ciconia nigra
White stork, Ciconia ciconia
Marabou stork, Leptoptilos crumenifer (A)
Yellow-billed stork, Mycteria ibis

Boobies and gannets
Order: SuliformesFamily: Sulidae

The sulids comprise the gannets and boobies. Both groups are medium to large coastal seabirds that plunge-dive for fish.

Masked booby, Sula dactylatra (A)
Brown booby, Sula leucogaster
Northern gannet, Morus bassanus

Anhingas
Order: SuliformesFamily: Anhingidae

Anhingas or darters are often called "snake-birds" because of their long thin neck, which gives a snake-like appearance when they swim with their bodies submerged. The males have black and dark-brown plumage, an erectile crest on the nape and a larger bill than the female. The females have much paler plumage especially on the neck and underparts. The darters have completely webbed feet and their legs are short and set far back on the body. Their plumage is somewhat permeable, like that of cormorants, and they spread their wings to dry after diving.

African darter, Anhinga rufa (A)

Cormorants and shags
Order: SuliformesFamily: Phalacrocoracidae

Phalacrocoracidae is a family of medium to large coastal, fish-eating seabirds that includes cormorants and shags. Plumage colouration varies, with the majority having mainly dark plumage, some species being black-and-white and a few being colourful.

Long-tailed cormorant, Microcarbo africanus (A)
Pygmy cormorant, Microcarbo pygmeus (A)
Great cormorant, Phalacrocorax carbo
European shag, Gulosus aristotelis (A)

Pelicans
Order: PelecaniformesFamily: Pelecanidae

Pelicans are large water birds with a distinctive pouch under their beak. As with other members of the order Pelecaniformes, they have webbed feet with four toes.

Great white pelican, Pelecanus onocrotalus
Pink-backed pelican, Pelecanus rufescens
Dalmatian pelican, Pelecanus crispus

Herons, egrets, and bitterns
Order: PelecaniformesFamily: Ardeidae

The family Ardeidae contains the bitterns, herons and egrets. Herons and egrets are medium to large wading birds with long necks and legs. Bitterns tend to be shorter necked and more wary. Members of Ardeidae fly with their necks retracted, unlike other long-necked birds such as storks, ibises and spoonbills.

Great bittern, Botaurus stellaris
Yellow bittern, Ixobrychus sinensis (A)
Little bittern, Ixobrychus minutus
Schrenck's bittern, Ixobrychus eurhythmus (A)
Gray heron, Ardea cinerea
Great blue heron, Ardea herodias (A)
Black-headed heron, Ardea melanocephala (A)
Goliath heron, Ardea goliath
Purple heron, Ardea purpurea
Great egret, Ardea alba
Little egret, Egretta garzetta
Western reef-heron, Egretta gularis
Cattle egret, Bubulcus ibis
Squacco heron, Ardeola ralloides
Striated heron, Butorides striata
Black-crowned night-heron, Nycticorax nycticorax

Ibises and spoonbills
Order: PelecaniformesFamily: Threskiornithidae

Threskiornithidae is a family of large terrestrial and wading birds which includes the ibises and spoonbills. They have long, broad wings with 11 primary and about 20 secondary feathers. They are strong fliers and despite their size and weight, very capable soarers.

Glossy ibis, Plegadis falcinellus
Northern bald ibis, Geronticus eremita (Ex)
African sacred ibis, Threskiornis aethiopicus (Ex)
Eurasian spoonbill, Platalea leucorodia

Secretarybird
Order: AccipitriformesFamily: Sagittariidae

The secretarybird is a bird of prey in the order Falconiformes but is easily distinguished from other raptors by its long crane-like legs.

Secretarybird, Sagittarius serpentarius (Ex)

Osprey
Order: AccipitriformesFamily: Pandionidae

The family Pandionidae contains only one species, the osprey. The osprey is a medium-large raptor which is a specialist fish-eater with a worldwide distribution.

Osprey, Pandion haliaetus

Hawks, eagles, and kites
Order: AccipitriformesFamily: Accipitridae

Accipitridae is a family of birds of prey, which includes hawks, eagles, kites, harriers and Old World vultures. These birds have powerful hooked beaks for tearing flesh from their prey, strong legs, powerful talons and keen eyesight.

Black-winged kite, Elanus caeruleus
Bearded vulture, Gypaetus barbatus
Egyptian vulture, Neophron percnopterus; Ancient Egyptian: 3 (the hieroglyph) 'one who treads ?
European honey-buzzard, Pernis apivorus (A)
Oriental honey-buzzard, Pernis ptilorhynchus (A)
Cinereous vulture, Aegypius monachus
Lappet-faced vulture, Torgos tracheliotos
White-backed vulture, Gyps africanus (A)
Rüppell's vulture, Gyps rueppelli
Eurasian griffon, Gyps fulvus; Ancient Egyptian:  'terrifying one' (A)
Bateleur, Terathopius ecaudatus
Short-toed snake-eagle, Circaetus gallicus
Lesser spotted eagle, Clanga pomarina
Greater spotted eagle, Clanga clanga
Wahlberg's eagle, Hieraaetus wahlbergi (A)
Booted eagle, Hieraaetus pennatus
Tawny eagle, Aquila rapax (A)
Steppe eagle, Aquila nipalensis
Imperial eagle, Aquila heliaca
Golden eagle, Aquila chrysaetos
Verreaux's eagle, Aquila verreauxii
Bonelli's eagle, Aquila fasciata
Gabar goshawk, Micronisus gabar (A)
Eurasian marsh-harrier, Circus aeruginosus
Hen harrier, Circus cyaneus
Pallid harrier, Circus macrourus
Montagu's harrier, Circus pygargus
Levant sparrowhawk, Accipiter brevipes
Eurasian sparrowhawk, Accipiter nisus
Northern goshawk, Accipiter gentilis
Red kite, Milvus milvus
Black kite, Milvus migrans; Ancient Egyptian: Dr/Dr.t (possibly) 'one who grasps/holds'
White-tailed eagle, Haliaeetus albicilla
African fish-eagle, Haliaeetus vocifer (A)
Common buzzard, Buteo buteo; Ancient Egyptian: tyw 'shrieker' (like ti3w) or 'treader' (like tiw(?)
Long-legged buzzard, Buteo rufinus

Barn-owls
Order: StrigiformesFamily: Tytonidae

Barn owls are medium to large owls with large heads and characteristic heart-shaped faces. They have long strong legs with powerful talons.

Barn owl, Tyto alba; its hieroglyph stands for the consonant -m- probably derived from the owl's name (i)m(w) 'one who moans, laments'

Owls
Order: StrigiformesFamily: Strigidae

The typical owls are small to large solitary nocturnal birds of prey. They have large forward-facing eyes and ears, a hawk-like beak and a conspicuous circle of feathers around each eye called a facial disk.

Eurasian scops-owl, Otus scops
Pallid scops-owl, Otus brucei (A)
Pharaoh eagle-owl, Bubo ascalaphus
Little owl, Athene noctua
Desert owl, Strix hadorami
Omani owl, Strix butleri
Long-eared owl, Asio otus
Short-eared owl, Asio flammeus

Hoopoes
Order: BucerotiformesFamily: Upupidae

Hoopoes have black, white and orangey-pink colouring with a large erectile crest on their head.

Eurasian hoopoe, Upupa epops; Ancient Egyptian: hieroglyph of the bird almost always used as or in the word db 'sundried brick' (literal meaning: 'one that blocks up'); therefore one of the ancient names must have been Db(3)w/Db(3).t 'the one who blocks up (its nest hole)'; a later name would be q(w)q(w)p.t > Coptic KOUKOUPAT/KRAPEP e.a. comparable to biblical dukhiphat (literal meaning unknown)

Kingfishers

Order: CoraciiformesFamily: Alcedinidae

Kingfishers are medium-sized birds with large heads, long, pointed bills, short legs and stubby tails.

Common kingfisher, Alcedo atthis; Ancient Egyptian: Hnty 'the one of the canal'
White-throated kingfisher, Halcyon smyrnensis
Collared kingfisher, Todirhamphus chloris
Pied kingfisher, Ceryle rudis; Ancient Egyptian: cnHb.t < cn-nHb.t 'the one turning around the neck (when hovering above water spying fish)'

Bee-eaters
Order: CoraciiformesFamily: Meropidae

The bee-eaters are a group of near passerine birds in the family Meropidae. Most species are found in Africa but others occur in southern Europe, Madagascar, Australia and New Guinea. They are characterised by richly coloured plumage, slender bodies and usually elongated central tail feathers. All are colourful and have long downturned bills and pointed wings, which give them a swallow-like appearance when seen from afar.

African green bee-eater, Merops viridissimus; Ancient Egyptian: w3D3D 'totally green one'
Blue-cheeked bee-eater, Merops persicus
European bee-eater, Merops apiaster

Rollers
Order: CoraciiformesFamily: Coraciidae

Rollers resemble crows in size and build, but are more closely related to the kingfishers and bee-eaters. They share the colourful appearance of those groups with blues and browns predominating. The two inner front toes are connected, but the outer toe is not.

European roller, Coracias garrulus; Ancient Egyptian  (meaning unknown)
Abyssinian roller, Coracias abyssinica (A)
Cinnamon roller, Eurystomus glaucurus (A)

Woodpeckers
Order: PiciformesFamily: Picidae

Woodpeckers are small to medium-sized birds with chisel-like beaks, short legs, stiff tails and long tongues used for capturing insects. Some species have feet with two toes pointing forward and two backward, while several species have only three toes. Many woodpeckers have the habit of tapping noisily on tree trunks with their beaks.

Eurasian wryneck, Jynx torquilla
Syrian woodpecker, Dendrocopos syriacus

Falcons and caracaras
Order: FalconiformesFamily: Falconidae

Falconidae is a family of diurnal birds of prey. They differ from hawks, eagles and kites in that they kill with their beaks instead of their talons. In Ancient Egyptian only one species is depicted as breeding in the Delta and called HrT (meaning unknown).

Lesser kestrel, Falco naumanni
Eurasian kestrel, Falco tinnunculus
Red-footed falcon, Falco vespertinus
Eleonora's falcon, Falco eleonorae
Sooty falcon, Falco concolor
Merlin, Falco columbarius
Eurasian hobby, Falco subbuteo
Lanner falcon, Falco biarmicus
Saker falcon, Falco cherrug (A)
Peregrine falcon, Falco peregrinus; Ancient Egyptian: its hieroglyphic sign stands for the deity Hr Horus 'the One Far Up/High'
Barbary falcon, Falco peregrinus pelegrinoides

Old World parrots
Order: PsittaciformesFamily: Psittaculidae

Characteristic features of parrots include a strong curved bill, an upright stance, strong legs, and clawed zygodactyl feet. Many parrots are vividly coloured, and some are multi-coloured. Old World parrots are found from Africa east across south and southeast Asia and Oceania to Australia and New Zealand.

Alexandrine parakeet, Psittacula eupatria (A)
Rose-ringed parakeet, Psittacula krameri (I)

Old World orioles
Order: PasseriformesFamily: Oriolidae

The Old World orioles are colourful passerine birds. They are not related to the New World orioles.

Eurasian golden oriole, Oriolus oriolus; Ancient Egyptian: gnw 'the one (with) carved (eye line)'

Bushshrikes and allies
Order: PasseriformesFamily: Malaconotidae

Bushshrikes are similar in habits to shrikes, hunting insects and other small prey from a perch on a bush. Although similar in build to the shrikes, these tend to be either colourful species or largely black; some species are quite secretive.

Rosy-patched bushshrike, Rhodophoneus cruentus

Shrikes
Order: PasseriformesFamily: Laniidae

Shrikes are passerine birds known for their habit of catching other birds and small animals and impaling the uneaten portions of their bodies on thorns. A typical shrike's beak is hooked, like a bird of prey.

Red-backed shrike, Lanius collurio
Red-tailed shrike, Lanius phoenicuroides
Isabelline shrike, Lanius isabellinus (A)
Great gray shrike, Lanius excubitor
Lesser gray shrike, Lanius minor
Masked shrike, Lanius nubicus
Woodchat shrike, Lanius senator

Crows, jays, and magpies
Order: PasseriformesFamily: Corvidae

The family Corvidae includes crows, ravens, jays, choughs, magpies, treepies, nutcrackers and ground jays. Corvids are above average in size among the Passeriformes, and some of the larger species show high levels of intelligence.

Ancient Egyptian names for crow or raven species include very possibly gbgb/gbg3; this bird is once called 3pd km or 'black bird', while its eggs could apparently be gathered according to a medical papyrus, and therefore points to a breeding bird of Egypt. In demotic an ʾbḳ-bird can be determined by help of the existence of Coptic abook 'Crow, raven'. But perhaps the latter is also a derivation of the bird name kbk.

Late Egyptian, male personal names include a Gebgeb, possible 'the crow', perhaps because the baby had black hair or a dark complexion. (drs. Carles Wolterman, Amstelveen, Holland)

House crow, Corvus splendens (I)
Rook, Corvus frugilegus
Carrion crow, Corvus corone
Hooded crow, Corvus cornix
Pied crow, Corvus albus (A)
Brown-necked raven, Corvus ruficollis
Fan-tailed raven, Corvus rhipidurus
Common raven, Corvus corax

Tits, chickadees, and titmice

Order: PasseriformesFamily: Paridae

The Paridae are mainly small stocky woodland species with short stout bills. Some have crests. They are adaptable birds, with a mixed diet including seeds and insects.

Great tit, Parus major

Penduline-tits
Order: PasseriformesFamily: Remizidae

The penduline-tits are a group of small passerine birds related to the true tits. They are insectivores.

Eurasian penduline-tit, Remiz pendulinus

Larks
Order: PasseriformesFamily: Alaudidae

Larks are small terrestrial birds with often extravagant songs and display flights. Most larks are fairly dull in appearance. Their food is insects and seeds.

Greater hoopoe-lark, Alaemon alaudipes
Thick-billed lark, Ramphocoris clotbey (A)
Bar-tailed lark, Ammomanes cincturus
Desert lark, Ammomanes deserti
Black-crowned sparrow-lark, Eremopterix nigriceps
Temminck's lark, Eremophila bilopha
Greater short-toed lark, Calandrella brachydactyla
Bimaculated lark, Melanocorypha bimaculata
Calandra lark, Melanocorypha calandra
Dupont's lark, Chersophilus duponti
Mediterranean short-toed lark, Alaudala rufescens
Turkestan short-toed lark, Alaudala heinei
Wood lark, Lullula arborea
Eurasian skylark, Alauda arvensis
Oriental skylark, Alauda gulgula
Thekla's lark, Galerida theklae (A)
Crested lark, Galerida cristata

Bearded reedling
Order: PasseriformesFamily: Panuridae

This species, the only one in its family, is found in reed beds throughout temperate Europe and Asia.

Bearded reedling, Panurus biarmicus (A)

Cisticolas and allies
Order: PasseriformesFamily: Cisticolidae

The Cisticolidae are warblers found mainly in warmer southern regions of the Old World. They are generally very small birds of drab brown or grey appearance found in open country such as grassland or scrub.

Graceful prinia, Prinia gracilis
Zitting cisticola, Cisticola juncidis

Reed warblers and allies

Order: PasseriformesFamily: Acrocephalidae

The members of this family are usually rather large for "warblers". Most are rather plain olivaceous brown above with much yellow to beige below. They are usually found in open woodland, reedbeds, or tall grass. The family occurs mostly in southern to western Eurasia and surroundings, but it also ranges far into the Pacific, with some species in Africa.

Thick-billed warbler, Arundinax aedon (A)
Booted warbler, Iduna caligata
Eastern olivaceous warbler, Iduna pallida
Western olivaceous warbler, Iduna opaca (A)
Upcher's warbler, Hippolais languida
Olive-tree warbler, Hippolais olivetorum
Icterine warbler, Hippolais icterina
Aquatic warbler, Acrocephalus paludicola (A)
Moustached warbler, Acrocephalus melanopogon
Sedge warbler, Acrocephalus schoenobaenus
Blyth's reed warbler, Acrocephalus dumetorum
Marsh warbler, Acrocephalus palustris
Eurasian reed warbler, Acrocephalus scirpaceus
Great reed warbler, Acrocephalus arundinaceus
Clamorous reed warbler, Acrocephalus stentoreus

Grassbirds and allies
Order: PasseriformesFamily: Locustellidae

Locustellidae are a family of small insectivorous songbirds found mainly in Eurasia, Africa, and the Australian region. They are smallish birds with tails that are usually long and pointed, and tend to be drab brownish or buffy all over.

River warbler, Locustella fluviatilis
Savi's warbler, Locustella luscinioides
Common grasshopper-warbler, Locustella naevia (A)

Swallows
Order: PasseriformesFamily: Hirundinidae

The family Hirundinidae is adapted to aerial feeding. They have a slender streamlined body, long pointed wings and a short bill with a wide gape. The feet are adapted to perching rather than walking, and the front toes are partially joined at the base.

Plain martin, Riparia paludicola (A)
Bank swallow, Riparia riparia
Banded martin, Neophedina cincta (A)
Eurasian crag-martin, Ptyonoprogne rupestris
Rock martin, Ptyonoprogne fuligula
Barn swallow, Hirundo rustica: Ancient Egyptian: mn.t (meaning uncertain)
Ethiopian swallow, Hirundo aethiopica (A)
Red-rumped swallow, Cecropis daurica
Streak-throated swallow, Petrochelidon fluvicola (A)
Common house-martin, Delichon urbicum

Bulbuls
Order: PasseriformesFamily: Pycnonotidae

Bulbuls are medium-sized songbirds. Some are colourful with yellow, red or orange vents, cheeks, throats or supercilia, but most are drab, with uniform olive-brown to black plumage. Some species have distinct crests.

Common bulbul, Pycnonotus barbatus
White-spectacled bulbul, Pycnonotus xanthopygos

Leaf warblers
Order: PasseriformesFamily: Phylloscopidae

Leaf warblers are a family of small insectivorous birds found mostly in Eurasia and ranging into Wallacea and Africa. The species are of various sizes, often green-plumaged above and yellow below, or more subdued with greyish-green to greyish-brown colours.

Wood warbler, Phylloscopus sibilatrix
Western Bonelli's warbler, Phylloscopus bonelli
Eastern Bonelli's warbler, Phylloscopus orientalis
Yellow-browed warbler, Phylloscopus inornatus (A)
Dusky warbler, Phylloscopus fuscatus (A)
Willow warbler, Phylloscopus trochilus
Common chiffchaff, Phylloscopus collybita
Greenish warbler, Phylloscopus trochiloides

Bush warblers and allies
Order: PasseriformesFamily: Scotocercidae

The members of this family are found throughout Africa, Asia, and Polynesia. Their taxonomy is in flux, and some authorities place genus Erythrocerus in another family.

Scrub warbler, Scotocerca inquieta
Cetti's warbler, Cettia cetti (A)

Sylviid warblers, parrotbills, and allies

Order: PasseriformesFamily: Sylviidae

The family Sylviidae is a group of small insectivorous passerine birds. They mainly occur as breeding species, as the common name implies, in Europe, Asia and, to a lesser extent, Africa. Most are of generally undistinguished appearance, but many have distinctive songs.

Eurasian blackcap, Sylvia atricapilla 
Garden warbler, Sylvia borin 
Barred warbler, Curruca nisoria
Lesser whitethroat, Curruca curruca
Arabian warbler, Curruca leucomelaena
Eastern Orphean warbler, Curruca crassirostris
Asian desert warbler, Curruca nana
Menetries's warbler, Curruca mystacea 
Rüppell's warbler, Curruca ruppeli
Cyprus warbler, Curruca melanothorax (A)
Sardinian warbler, Curruca melanocephala 
Eastern subalpine warbler, Curruca cantillans
Greater whitethroat, Curruca communis
Spectacled warbler, Curruca conspicillata
Marmora's warbler, Curruca sarda (A)

Laughingthrushes and allies 
Order: PasseriformesFamily: Leiothrichidae

The laughingthrushes are somewhat diverse in size and colouration, but are characterised by soft fluffy plumage.

Fulvous chatterer, Argya fulva
Arabian babbler, Argya squamiceps

Kinglets
Order: PasseriformesFamily: Regulidae

The kinglets, also called crests, are a small group of birds often included in the Old World warblers, but frequently given family status because they also resemble the titmice.

Goldcrest, Regulus regulus
Common firecrest, Regulus ignicapillus (A)

Wrens
Order: PasseriformesFamily: Troglodytidae

The wrens are mainly small and inconspicuous except for their loud songs. These birds have short wings and thin down-turned bills. Several species often hold their tails upright. All are insectivorous.

Eurasian wren, Troglodytes troglodytes (A)

Starlings
Order: PasseriformesFamily: Sturnidae

Starlings are small to medium-sized passerine birds. Their flight is strong and direct and they are very gregarious. Their preferred habitat is fairly open country. They eat insects and fruit. Plumage is typically dark with a metallic sheen.

European starling, Sturnus vulgaris
Rosy starling, Pastor roseus
Common myna, Acridotheres tristis (I)
Tristram's starling, Onychognathus tristramii

Thrushes and allies

Order: PasseriformesFamily: Turdidae

The thrushes are a group of passerine birds that occur mainly in the Old World. They are plump, soft plumaged, small to medium-sized insectivores or sometimes omnivores, often feeding on the ground. Many have attractive songs.

Mistle thrush, Turdus viscivorus
Song thrush, Turdus philomelos
Redwing, Turdus iliacus
Eurasian blackbird, Turdus merula
Fieldfare, Turdus pilaris
Ring ouzel, Turdus torquatus
Black-throated thrush, Turdus atrogularis (A)

Old World flycatchers
Order: PasseriformesFamily: Muscicapidae

Old World flycatchers are a large group of small passerine birds native to the Old World. They are mainly small arboreal insectivores. The appearance of these birds is highly varied, but they mostly have weak songs and harsh calls.

Spotted flycatcher, Muscicapa striata
Black scrub-robin, Cercotrichas podobe (A)
Rufous-tailed scrub-robin, Cercotrichas galactotes
European robin, Erithacus rubecula
White-throated robin, Irania gutturalis (A)
Thrush nightingale, Luscinia luscinia
Common nightingale, Luscinia megarhynchos
Bluethroat, Luscinia svecica
Red-breasted flycatcher, Ficedula parva
Semicollared flycatcher, Ficedula semitorquata
European pied flycatcher, Ficedula hypoleuca
Collared flycatcher, Ficedula albicollis
Common redstart, Phoenicurus phoenicurus
Black redstart, Phoenicurus ochruros
Rufous-tailed rock-thrush, Monticola saxatilis
Blue rock-thrush, Monticola solitarius
Whinchat, Saxicola rubetra
European stonechat, Saxicola rubicola
Siberian stonechat, Saxicola maurus (A)
Pied bushchat, Saxicola caprata (A)
Northern wheatear, Oenanthe oenanthe
Isabelline wheatear, Oenanthe isabellina
Hooded wheatear, Oenanthe monacha
Desert wheatear, Oenanthe deserti
Western black-eared wheatear, Oenanthe hispanica
Cyprus wheatear, Oenanthe cypriaca
Eastern black-eared wheatear, Oenanthe melanoleuca
Pied wheatear, Oenanthe pleschanka (A)
Red-rumped wheatear, Oenanthe moesta
Blackstart, Cercomela melanura
White-crowned wheatear, Oenanthe leucopyga
Finsch's wheatear, Oenanthe finschii
Mourning wheatear, Oenanthe lugens
Kurdish wheatear, Oenanthe xanthoprymna
Persian wheatear, Oenanthe chrysopygia (A)

Hypocolius
Order: PasseriformesFamily: Hypocoliidae

The hypocolius is a small Middle Eastern bird with the shape and soft plumage of a waxwing. They are mainly a uniform grey colour except the males have a black triangular mask around their eyes.

Hypocolius, Hypocolius ampelinus (A)

Sunbirds and spiderhunters
Order: PasseriformesFamily: Nectariniidae

The sunbirds and spiderhunters are very small passerine birds which feed largely on nectar, although they will also take insects, especially when feeding young. Flight is fast and direct on their short wings. Most species can take nectar by hovering like a hummingbird, but usually perch to feed.

Nile Valley sunbird, Hedydipna metallica
Palestine sunbird, Cinnyris oseus
Shining sunbird, Cinnyris habessinicus (A)

Weavers and allies
Order: PasseriformesFamily: Ploceidae

The weavers are small passerine birds related to the finches. They are seed-eating birds with rounded conical bills. The males of many species are brightly coloured, usually in red or yellow and black, some species show variation in colour only in the breeding season.

Village weaver, Ploceus cucullatus (A)
Streaked weaver, Ploceus manyar (I)

Waxbills and allies
Order: PasseriformesFamily: Estrildidae

The estrildid finches are small passerine birds of the Old World tropics and Australasia. They are gregarious and often colonial seed eaters with short thick but pointed bills. They are all similar in structure and habits, but have wide variation in plumage colours and patterns.

Indian silverbill, Euodice malabarica (I)
Red avadavat, Amandava amandava (I)

Accentors
Order: PasseriformesFamily: Prunellidae

The accentors are in the only bird family, Prunellidae, which is completely endemic to the Palearctic. They are small, fairly drab species superficially similar to sparrows.

Dunnock, Prunella modularis

Old World sparrows
Order: PasseriformesFamily: Passeridae

Old World sparrows are small passerine birds. In general, sparrows tend to be small, plump, brown or grey birds with short tails and short powerful beaks. Old World sparrows are seed eaters, but they also consume small insects.

House sparrow, Passer domesticus
Spanish sparrow, Passer hispaniolensis
Dead Sea sparrow, Passer moabiticus (A)
Desert sparrow, Passer simplex (A)
Eurasian tree sparrow, Passer montanus (A)
Yellow-throated sparrow, Gymnoris xanthocollis (A)
Pale rockfinch, Carpospiza brachydactyla
White-winged snowfinch, Montifringilla nivalis (A)

Wagtails and pipits
Order: PasseriformesFamily: Motacillidae

Motacillidae is a family of small passerine birds with medium to long tails. They include the wagtails, longclaws and pipits. They are slender, ground feeding insectivores of open country.

Gray wagtail, Motacilla cinerea
Western yellow wagtail, Motacilla flava; Ancient Egyptian (possibly): bnw (meaning unknown)
Citrine wagtail, Motacilla citreola (A)
African pied wagtail, Motacilla aguimp
White wagtail, Motacilla alba
Richard's pipit, Anthus richardi (A)
Long-billed pipit, Anthus similis
Tawny pipit, Anthus campestris
Meadow pipit, Anthus pratensis 
Tree pipit, Anthus trivialis
Olive-backed pipit, Anthus hodgsoni (A)
Red-throated pipit, Anthus cervinus
Water pipit, Anthus spinoletta
American pipit, Anthus rubescens (A)

Finches, euphonias, and allies
Order: PasseriformesFamily: Fringillidae

Finches are seed-eating passerine birds, that are small to moderately large and have a strong beak, usually conical and in some species very large. All have twelve tail feathers and nine primaries. These birds have a bouncing flight with alternating bouts of flapping and gliding on closed wings, and most sing well.

Common chaffinch, Fringilla coelebs
Brambling, Fringilla montifringilla
Hawfinch, Coccothraustes coccothraustes
Common rosefinch, Carpodacus erythrinus
Sinai rosefinch, Carpodacus synoicus
Trumpeter finch, Bucanetes githaginea
Mongolian finch, Rhodopechys mongolica
European greenfinch, Chloris chloris
Eurasian linnet, Linaria cannabina
European goldfinch, Carduelis carduelis
European serin, Serinus serinus
Fire-fronted serin, Serinus pusillus (A)
Syrian serin, Serinus syriacus
Eurasian siskin, Spinus spinus

Old World buntings
Order: PasseriformesFamily: Emberizidae

The emberizids are a large family of passerine birds. They are seed-eating birds with distinctively shaped bills. In Europe, most species are called buntings. Many emberizid species have distinctive head patterns.

Black-headed bunting, Emberiza melanocephala
Red-headed bunting, Emberiza bruniceps (A)
Corn bunting, Emberiza calandra
Cirl bunting, Emberiza cirlus (A)
Gray-necked bunting, Emberiza buchanani (A)
Cinereous bunting, Emberiza cineracea (A)
Ortolan bunting, Emberiza hortulana
Cretzschmar's bunting, Emberiza caesia
House bunting, Emberiza sahari (A)
Striolated bunting, Emberiza striolata
Reed bunting, Emberiza schoeniclus (A)
Yellow-breasted bunting, Emberiza aureola (A)
Little bunting, Emberiza pusilla (A)
Rustic bunting, Emberiza rustica (A)

See also
List of birds
Lists of birds by region

References
Specific

General

External links
Birds of Egypt - World Institute for Conservation and Environment

Egypt
Egypt
Birds
Egypt